Joaquín Gamboa Pascoe (May 30, 1922 – January 7, 2016) was a Mexican trade union leader and politician.

Biography
He had a degree in law from the National Autonomous University of Mexico. Gamboa Pascoe was the secretary general of the Federal District Federation of Workers (in Spanish: Federación de Trabajadores del Distrito Federal, FTDF) and since August 9, 2005 he was the current secretary general of the Confederation of Mexican Workers (CTM), the largest confederation of labor unions in the country.

Gamboa Pascoe was elected to the Senate in the mid-1970s, representing the Institutional Revolutionary Party. He ran for reelection in 1988 but lost his bid against Porfirio Muñoz Ledo, a left-wing politician. He has also served in the Chamber of Deputies.

Gamboa Pascoe died on January 7, 2016, aged 93.

References

External links
 Líder obrero que goza de lujos ("A worker's leader who enjoys luxury"), article from El Universal.

1922 births
2016 deaths
Institutional Revolutionary Party politicians
Mexican people of Basque descent
Mexican people of Cornish descent
Members of the Chamber of Deputies (Mexico)
Presidents of the Chamber of Deputies (Mexico)
Members of the Senate of the Republic (Mexico)
Presidents of the Senate of the Republic (Mexico)
Mexican trade unionists
National Autonomous University of Mexico alumni
People named in the Paradise Papers
20th-century Mexican politicians